A pediatrician by profession, Dr. Rafique Anjum (alternate spelling Dr Anjum Awan) is an Urdu/Punjabi and Gojri poet, Islamic scholar and researcher of Jammu and Kashmir. He received state level award for Excellence in Literature in 2007, and is a member of General Council of Jammu and Kashmir Academy of Art, Culture and Languages. He has served as Registrar and Consultant Pediatrician in GMC Srinagar and Consultant Paediatrician in JK Health services . Presently he is working as  Coordinator Centre for Research in Gojri, Pahari & Kashmiri Languages and Asst. Professor in  School of Islamic Studies and Languages at BGSBU.

Literary life 
Anjum Awan is a poet and scholar of both Urdu and Gojri languages besides being a writer of English language. A number of his poetic collections both in Urdu and Gojri languages have earned him accolades across the sub-continent.
He represents the higher echelon of the modern Gojri scholarship.

Honours and awards 
 Academy Best Book Award Dil Darya 1996.
 Himalayan Man Of Letters Award (HEM)1999.
 State Level Academy Award for Excellence in Literature 2007.
Gujjar Gandhi Award 2017
State Humanity Award 2018
Award for Excellence in Literature 2019
Life Member IAP Mumbai INDIA
J&K Government UT Level First Tribal Award in the category of Literature 2022 handed over by Lt. Governor, Jammu Kashmir

Publications

Creative writing 
 Khwab Jazeeray(Urdu Poetry) 1993.
 Dil Darya (Gojri Poetry)1995. Best book Award twice, 1996.
 Kora Kagaz (Gojri short stories)1996.
 Soghaat (Gojri Poetry Revised & Enlarged edition) 2004.
 Kaash! (Urdu Poetry Revised & Enlarged edition) 2005.
Banjara( A Directory of Indo-Pak Gojri Writers) 2007.
ZANBEEL 2018
CHITTI MITTI (Fiction) 2019

Research and analysis 
 Golden History Of Gojri Language And Literature. (Ten volumes)
 vol. I Prologue to Golden History) 	
 vol. II Ancient Gojri literature,
 vol. III Modern Gojri literature, 		
 vol. IV Modern Gojri Poetry,
 vol. V Gojri Ghazal (an anthology), 	
 vol. IV Gojri Songs (geet),
 vol. VII Gojri short stories (an anthology),
 vol. VIII Gojri Drama (an anthology),
 vol. IX Biography of Gojri Writers) 	
 vol. X Abridged Golden History.

Miscellaneous 
 Soch Samandar (An anthology of modern Gojri Poetry) 1994
 Ghazal Silony (An anthology of modern Gojri Ghazal) 1995
 Gojri Quotations (Mhara Akhaan, mhari pachhaan).
 Basic Gojri Grammar (the first-ever Gojri Grammar:co-author: Mansha Khaki
 Anjum Shanasi (Biographical notes, articles and expert views/comments on life and works of Dr. Rafique Anjum)

Lexicography 
 Gojri English Dictionary 2004 (the first-ever bilingual Gojri Dictionary) Best book Award 2007.
 Gojri Urdu English Dictionary 2007
 Gojri Kashmiri English Dictionary 2018
 Gojri Hindi English Dictionary (under compilation)

References

1962 births
Living people
Kashmiri writers
People from Jammu and Kashmir